Pedro de la Barra (October 23, 1912 - July 6, 1977) was a Chilean theatre director. He won the National Prize of Art of Chile in 1952.

References

1912 births
1977 deaths
University of Chile alumni
Chilean theatre directors
Death in Caracas